Gorjului is a metro station in Bucharest named after the Piaţa Gorjului (Gorjului Market), east of which is situated. The station was opened on 31 August 1994 on already operating extension from Eroilor to Industriilor.

It was added later to the system in the 1990s, and built in two stages. The platform for trains headed for Industriilor was built first, and after a few years, the platform for trains headed for Eroilor entered revenue service. As a consequence the two platforms and associated vestibules were built with different materials and different colour schemes were used (the outbound platform features a warm reddish colour scheme, while the inbound platform uses a darker colder materials and colours).

There are plans for the Casa Gorjeana tradition restaurant to open a subsidiary inside the station's vestibule.

References

Bucharest Metro stations
Railway stations opened in 1991
1994 establishments in Romania